The 2012–13 Loyola Marymount Lions women's basketball team represented the Loyola Marymount in the 2012–13 college basketball season. The Lions, members of the West Coast Conference, were led by head coach Charity Elliott, in her 1st season at the school. The Lions played their home games at the Gersten Pavilion on the university campus in Los Angeles, California, and finished the season 13–18, 6–10 in conference play.

Before the Season
The Lions were picked to finish seventh in the WCC Pre-Season poll.

Roster

Schedule

|-
!colspan=12 style="background:#00345B; color:#8E0028;"| Exhibition

|-
!colspan=12 style="background:#8E0028; color:#00345B;"| Regular Season

|-
!colspan=12 style="background:#00345B; color:#8E0028;"| 2013 West Coast Conference women's basketball tournament

Rankings

See also
Loyola Marymount Lions women's basketball

References

Loyola Marymount Lions women's basketball seasons
Loyola Marymount